Felix William "Wimpy" Buquid Fuentebella is a lawyer and politician who was the former representative of the 4th and 3rd district of the Province of Camarines Sur, which is popularly known as the "Partido District".

Early life and education
Felix William "Wimpy" Fuentebella was born in Quezon City to former Speaker of the House and Congressman Arnulfo P. Fuentebella and Sagñay Municipal Mayor Evelyn Buquid.

He belongs to the century-old dominating political family in the Philippines. Wimpy is a fourth-generation politician from the family's patriarch Mariano Fuentebella who became the Governor of Ambos Camarines (combined Camarines Norte and Camarines Sur) during the American period.

He studied in elementary and high school in the Ateneo de Manila University from 1989 to 1993. He received his Bachelor of Science in Business Administration from the University of the Philippines from 1993 to 1997, where he was a member of the Upsilon Sigma Phi fraternity. He started his Bachelor of Laws degree in the Ateneo Law School from 1998 to 2001 and was cut shortly after he was elected as the Representative of the Partido District. After his 3-year term, he continued studying at San Sebastian College Recoletos Institute of Law and passed the Bar Exams in 2009. He was admitted to the Integrated Bar of the Philippines, the Partido Bar Association, and the Rinconada Bar Association.

Political and Professional Career
Before he was elected as the Congressman of the Third District (now Fourth District) of Camarines Sur, he worked to the office of his father Arnulfo Fuentebella as a Political Affairs Officer from 1997 until 2000. After his father has reached his three consecutive term limit as congressman, he was chosen to replace his father to the Congress in 2001 at the age of 26, therefore being the youngest legislator of the 12th Congress of the Philippines and serving as its Assistant Majority Floor Leader. He was noted for leading an investigation of the possible misuse of the Judicial Development Fund and filing an impeachment complaint against Chief Justice Hilario Davide, Jr.

During his term as congressman, he co-authored the Anti-Money Laundering Act(RA 9160) and pursued amendments to the Procurement Reform Act (RA 9184).

After his father returned to Congress, Wimpy served as the Chief Of Staff and Head of Legislative Staff from 2007 to 2010. During this time, he was also the co-chairman of the Partido Development Administration (PDA) Board. He was chosen as the Housing Commissioner of the Housing and Land Use Regulatory Board (HLURB) by President Benigno Aquino, III in 2010 and later appointed as the Deputy Secretary General of the Housing and Urban Development Coordinating Council (HUDCC) in 2011 by Vice-President Jejomar Binay. He resigned to the post in 2012 to run for Congress and succeed his father as the representative of Partido.

He won by a close fight to actor-turned politician Aga Muhlach in the 2013 Philippine House of Representatives elections.

References

Living people
Members of the House of Representatives of the Philippines from Camarines Sur
Ateneo de Manila University alumni
University of the Philippines alumni
Nationalist People's Coalition politicians
United Nationalist Alliance politicians
People from Camarines Sur
People from Quezon City
Felix William
San Sebastian College – Recoletos alumni
Year of birth missing (living people)